José Daniel Viejo Redondo (born 8 December 1997) is a Spanish cyclist, who last rode for UCI Professional Continental team .

Major results
2017
 4th GP Izola
 10th Circuito del Porto

References

External links

1997 births
Living people
Spanish male cyclists
Sportspeople from Oviedo
Cyclists from Asturias